is a railway station in Kitami, Hokkaidō Prefecture, Japan. Its station number is A59.

Layout
Nishi-Kitami Station has a ground side platform serving bi-directional traffic.

Adjacent stations

Railway stations in Hokkaido Prefecture
Railway stations in Japan opened in 1986
Kitami, Hokkaido

References